Bantva or Bantwa, is a small town in Saurashtra region of the state of Gujarat in India.

Geography 
Bantva is located at an altitude of 20 meters. Nearby towns are Nanadiya, Limbuda, Nakara Manavadar, Vanthali, Junagadh, Keshod, Visavadar, Kutiyana, Dhoraji, Porbandar and Rajkot. The town is roughly 10 kilometers from the Arabian Sea.

History 

Before the Independence of India in 1947, Bantva was part of the princely state of Bantva Manavadar in Kathiawar, founded in 1760 and locally ruled until February 1948 by Khan Himmat Khan, son of Khan Amir Khan, of the Muslim Babi family of Junagadh State.  In 1947 it followed the neighboring and more powerful Princely state of Junagadh into union with Pakistan, but that decision was quickly reversed by Indian occupation and subsequent plebiscite.  It is a decision Pakistan has never accepted.

Demographics 
Before 1947, the population of Bantva was approximately 20,000; 80% of its population was Memon. As of the 2001 India census, Bantva had a population of 15,216. Males constitute 52% of the population and females 48%. Bantva has an average literacy rate of 69%, higher than the national average of 59.5%, with 57% of the males and 43% of females literate. 12% of the population is under 6 years of age.

Places of interest 
Places of interest in Bantva are:
Bantwa Gymkhana
Barwali Masjid
Jamia Masjid
Madrassa E Islamia
Mazaar Of Bukhari Sharif
Yateem Khana Islamia

Notable locals of Bantva 

 Arif Habib - Pakistani business magnate and stock market trader who is the founder of the Arif Habib Group
 Abdul Sattar Edhi - Humanitarian, Social Worker and founder of Edhi Foundation, which has the largest private ambulance service network in the world. Born in a Memon family, which, during partition, migrated to Pakistan and settled in Karachi.
 Bilquis Edhi - Wife of Abdul Sattar Edhi
 Ahmad Adaya - founder of IDS Real Estate Group, one of the California's largest real estate companies.
 Ahmed Dawood - Pakistani pioneer merchant, industrialist, philanthropist and founder of the Dawood Group, .
 Shrikant Shah - Indian novelist and short story writer.
 Rajendra Shukla - Indian poet
 Mustafa Hanif Balagamwala - Honorary Secretary General of Memon Professional Forum.
 Dada Family - The Dada family employed Mahatma Gandhi as their lawyer. They sent him to South Africa, as their attorney in the 1890's.  
 Cochinwala Family - The Cochinwala family had a building in Bantva where they conducted business. They now reside in Pakistan, Texas, and California.

References

Sources and external links 
 My Memories of Bantva By: Abdur Razzaq Thaplawala
 Batva Recollection (Excerpts from "A Ramble Through Life" by Mr. Kassim Dada)
 Memon Po!nt by Abdul Ghaffar Variend, Chicago, IL USA
 World Memon Organization of North America, Chicago, IL USA
 Manavadar-Bantva Princely State

Memon
Cities and towns in Junagadh district